Coach Trip is a British reality television game show that involves ordinary couples, with a pre-existing relationship, board a coach and travel to destinations around Europe on a 20-day tour. Those who board the coach have to try to avoid votes from the other couples on board, voting takes place at the end of each day of the trip. Series 11 began on 24 November 2014, airing weekdays at 17:30 on Channel 4. Brendan Sheerin returned as tour guide, as in all previous editions.

This was the second block of 20 episodes out of the 80 commissioned in 2014.

Contestants

References

2014 British television seasons
Coach Trip series